Skitnica is the second studio album by Montenegrin singer Šako Polumenta, which was released in 1995.

Track listing 
 Daj meni grešniku
 Ne laži da me voliš
 Skitnica
 Pod sjajem ružičastih zvezda
 Moje ruke tvoje traže
 Hej gde si ti sad
 Pitam se gde je sad
 Lažu pesme i kafane
 Nekad si ljubav, nekad greh
 Ti si razlog moje sreće

1995 albums
Šako Polumenta albums